The 1945–46 Ohio Bobcats men's basketball team represented Ohio University in the college basketball season of 1945–46. The team was coached by Dutch Trautwein and played their home games at the Men's Gymnasium.  They finished the season 11–8 .

Schedule

|-
!colspan=9 style=| Regular Season

 Source:

References

Ohio Bobcats men's basketball seasons
1945 in sports in Ohio
1946 in sports in Ohio